{{DISPLAYTITLE:C7H14O}}
The molecular formula C7H14O (molar mass: 114.18 g/mol) may refer to:

 Cyclohexylmethanol
 Heptanal, or heptanaldehyde
 Heptanones
 2-Heptanone
 3-Heptanone
 4-Heptanone

Molecular formulas